Kugathas Tharshan (died 25 January 2016; also spelled Kugadas Darshan) was a 6 year old Sri Lankan Tamil boy who was raped and murdered near the Sampur High Security Zone in eastern Sri Lanka in January 2016.

Background
Tharshan's family resettled in Sampur in 2015. He had enrolled at Sampur Maha Vidyalayam in the first grade, in January 2016. Eyewitnesses had seen Sri Lanka Navy personnel from a nearby sentry point grooming Tharshan with chocolates and other food.

Incident
On 25 January 2016 Tharshan had been playing with his brother and another boy. Later Tharshan's father Selvaratnam Kugathas had seen him playing in front of their home. He then disappeared. Tharshan's mother Kugathas Jeyavani went to find him but could not locate him. He was reported missing at around 5:30 p.m. Locals initially thought that Tharshan had slipped and fell into the well. Coroner A. J. A. Noorullah arrived at the scene after a while and instructed a person to retrieve the body. According to locals there were signs that Tharshan had been sexually abused before being murdered.

Tharshan's body was sent to Trincomalee Hospital for a post-mortem. According to Judicial Medical Officer W. R. A. S. Rajapakshe the preliminary post-mortem has revealed that Tharshan died of drowning. Rajapakshe's report was submitted to Muttur Magistrate I. N. Rilwan for further investigation. The police returned Tharshan's body to his family following the post-mortem. According to the police there were no signs of sexual assault.

Investigation
A fifteen-year-old boy was arrested on 2 February 2016 in connection with the murder. However, locals have alleged that navy personnel were responsible for raping and murdering Tharshan and that the police were protecting them.

See also
 Murder of S. Vithiya

References

2016 deaths
2016 crimes in Sri Lanka
2016 murders in Asia
January 2016 crimes in Asia
People from Eastern Province, Sri Lanka
People murdered in Sri Lanka
Rape in Sri Lanka
Sri Lankan murder victims
Murdered Sri Lankan children
Violence against men in Asia
Incidents of violence against boys
Deaths by drowning
Child sexual abuse in Sri Lanka